IslandWood is a non-profit environmental education organization with programs on Bainbridge Island, Seattle, and Woodinville in Washington.

History
Local residents Debbi and Paul Brainerd proposed the idea of building a children's outdoor education center; a subsequent feasibility study showed that half of Puget Sound area students did not receive overnight outdoor education programs. The Brainerds purchased  of land for the program, which was founded in 2000. In 2011, IslandWood was selected to lead the education programs at the Brightwater sewage treatment plant.

Programs
IslandWood runs the Graduate Program in Education for Environment and Community (EEC) which is offered in partnership with the University of Washington College of Education.

In 2014, IslandWood partnered with Antioch University Seattle (AUS) to launch the Urban Environmental Education Program. In 2019, IslandWood and AUS ended their partnership, with AUS taking over the program.

References

External links
Official website

Bainbridge Island, Washington
Education in Washington (state)
Nature centers in Washington (state)
Tourist attractions in Kitsap County, Washington
Protected areas of Kitsap County, Washington